Liam Broady and Joshua Ward-Hibbert won the event in 2012.
Jay Andrijic and Bradley Mousley won this year's edition 6–3, 7–6(7–3) against Maximilian Marterer and Lucas Miedler.

Seeds

Draw

Finals

Top half

Bottom half

External links 
 Draw

Boys' Doubles
2013